Raassilla is a village in Viljandi Parish, Viljandi County, Estonia. Between 1991–2017 (until the administrative reform of Estonian municipalities) the village was located in Tarvastu Parish.

Raassilla is home to the Raassilla Speedway, which holds motorcross events. It is also the birthplace of Estonian botanist Jaan Port (1891–1950).

References

Villages in Viljandi County